This Sporting Life is a 1963 British kitchen sink drama film directed by Lindsay Anderson. Based on the 1960 novel of the same name by David Storey, which won the 1960 Macmillan Fiction Award, it recounts the story of a rugby league footballer, Frank Machin, in Wakefield, a mining city in Yorkshire, whose romantic life is not as successful as his sporting life. Storey, a former professional rugby league footballer, also wrote the screenplay.

The film stars Richard Harris, Rachel Roberts, William Hartnell and Alan Badel. The film was Harris's first starring role, and won him the Best Actor Award at the 1963 Cannes Film Festival. He was also nominated for an Oscar for Best Actor in a Leading Role. Roberts won her second BAFTA award and received an Oscar nomination for Best Actress. Harris was nominated for the BAFTA that year as well. The film opened at the Odeon Leicester Square in London's West End on 7 February 1963.

Plot 
Set in the fictional city of City, the film concerns Frank Machin (Harris) a bitter young coal miner from the West Riding of Yorkshire. The first part of the story is told through a series of flashbacks when Frank is unconscious under a full anaesthetic in a dentist’s chair, having had his front teeth broken in a rugby league match. The second part takes place after the dentist has extracted his broken teeth.

Following a nightclub altercation, in which Frank takes on the captain of the local rugby league club and punches a couple of the others, he is recruited by the team's manager, who sees profit in his aggressive streak.

Although at first somewhat unco-ordinated at the sport, he impresses the team's owner, Gerald Weaver (Badel), with the spirit and brutality of his playing style during the trial. He is signed up to the top team as a loose forward (number 13) and impresses all with his aggressive forward play. He often punches or elbows the opposing players.

Off the field, Frank is much less successful. His recently-widowed landlady, Mrs Margaret Hammond (Roberts), a mother of two young children, lost her husband in an accident at Weaver's engineering firm but received little financial compensation, because the death was ruled a suicide.

Margaret rebuffs Frank’s attempts to court her and treats him rudely and abrasively. Frank takes Margaret and her children out for the day and they play in the River Wharfe next to Bolton Priory. She gets annoyed when he comes home drunk. Frank desires her sexually and one day grabs her and forces her onto his bed. Her child interrupts them, but then she acquiesces and they have sexual relations.

Later, Frank buys Christmas presents for the children and Margaret. This is the night following his losing his teeth. Margaret agrees to share his bed to keep him warm as he looks unwell. But in her grief she cannot really return his affection saying she is scared to invest her feelings in one person as they might go away or die. She sometimes insults him, referring to him as "just a great ape", and on their first proper date at a smart restaurant Frank insults the staff and protocol because he feels out of his depth. Margaret is embarrassed and the scene is witnessed by the Weavers. Mrs Weaver says she feels sorry for her. Back home Margaret reconsiders her relationship with Frank.

Frank's friend, Maurice, gets married and he and Margaret attend. When Frank goes over to congratulate the couple, Margaret walks away. She says she feels ashamed, like a kept woman, especially as he has bought her a fur coat. He strikes her but does not offer to marry her. He said he thought she was happy. She says, on another occasion that their neighbours think she is a slut and she and the children are not 'proper people' because of him. They have a row and Frank goes drinking with Morris. He wants another job, 'something permanent'. He believes Margaret needs him but does not realise it.

Frank tries to talk to Margaret but she defends her privacy by saying he knows nothing about Eric, her husband. He says she drove Eric to suicide and Margaret, outraged, demands that Frank leave. She starts throwing his belongings out of his room. He says he loves her but she is furious with him. Eventually he leaves to stay at a homeless men's shelter, leaving his Bentley outside on bombed land.

Frank has another quarrel with Weaver and his predatory wife, whose advances he had rejected much to her chagrin. Intending a reconciliation with Margaret, he returns to the house but a neighbour says she is in hospital. She is unconscious, having suffered a brain haemorrhage. The doctor says she does not have the strength or perhaps even the will to survive. Frank sits with her, holds her hand and talks gently to her. Frank is distracted from her final moment by a spider on the wall. Blood seeps from Margaret's mouth as she dies. In his rage he punches the spider. He does not speak to the children or their minder when he leaves the hospital.

In the end, Frank is seen as "just a great ape on a football field", vulnerable to the ravages of time and injury. In the penultimate scene he returns to Margaret's house and breaks in by the back door. He calls her name and briefly hangs from a lintel by one arm, like an ape might. In the closing scene, we see him playing rugby league again, exhausted.

Cast

 Richard Harris as Frank Machin
 Rachel Roberts as Margaret Hammond
 Alan Badel as Gerald Weaver
 William Hartnell as "Dad" Johnson
 Colin Blakely as Maurice Braithwaite
 Vanda Godsell as Mrs. Anne Weaver
 Anne Cunningham as Judith
 Jack Watson as Len Miller
 Arthur Lowe as Charles Slomer
 Harry Markham as Wade
 George Sewell as Jeff
 Leonard Rossiter as Phillips, Sports writer
 Peter Duguid as Doctor
 Wallas Eaton as Waiter
 Anthony Woodruff as Tom, Head waiter
 Tom Clegg as Gower
 Ken Traill as the Trainer
 Frank Windsor as the Dentist
 Ian Thompson as the Batley Town captain

Production
This was Anderson's first feature film as director, although he had won an Oscar for his short documentary Thursday's Children (1954), one of the documentaries he had made in the previous decade. The project had first been discussed by The Rank Organisation as a possible project for Joseph Losey and then Karel Reisz who, reluctant to direct another film with a similar setting and theme to Saturday Night and Sunday Morning (1960), suggested that Lindsay Anderson direct it with himself serving as producer.

Among the supporting cast is William Hartnell, who shortly afterwards began his role as Doctor Who. It was his role in This Sporting Life that brought Hartnell to the attention of Doctor Who producer Verity Lambert. The film also features Arthur Lowe, later to star in Dad's Army, who appeared in four later films directed by Anderson. In addition, Edward Fox, Anton Rodgers and Bryan Mosley appear as uncredited extras.

Filming locations
Many of the scenes in This Sporting Life were filmed at Wakefield Trinity's stadium, Belle Vue and at the Halifax stadium Thrum Hall. The scene where Frank (Richard Harris) leaps from a bus to buy a newspaper, then leaps back onto the bus was filmed at the top of Westgate, Wakefield. The location is still instantly recognisable and has changed little in the decades since. The houses used for filming the outdoor scenes in This Sporting Life were in Servia Terrace in Leeds. The riverside location where Frank takes the family for an outing in his new car is Bolton Abbey in the Yorkshire Dales.

Editing
Anthony Sloman wrote

A description of the editing says

Direction
Anderson wrote in his diary on 23 April 1962, after the first month or so of production, "the most striking feature of it all, I suppose, has been the splendour and misery of my work and relationship with Richard". He felt that Harris was acting better than ever before in his career, but feared his feelings for Harris, whose combination of physicality, affection and cruelty fascinated him, meant that he lacked the detachment he needed as a director. "I ought to be calm and detached with him. Instead I am impulsive, affectionate, infinitely susceptible."

Critical reception and box office
The response from critics was favourable. In the United States, copy from the Reuters news agency described it as being praised unanimously by the critics for New York City publications. Variety praised its "gutsy vitality" and praised the production of Reisz and the directorial feature début of Anderson, who "brings the keen, observant eye of a documentary man to many vivid episodes without sacrificing the story line".

However, on first release, the film was a commercial flop with British audiences and did not recoup its cost. The Chairman of the Rank Organisation, John Davis, announced that the company would not venture further with "kitchen sink" film projects. Nor would his company make such a "squalid" film again. More generally, it ended producers' willingness to back such British New Wave films.

John Russell Taylor in 1980 thought it a mistake to link This Sporting Life with the "kitchen sink" films released in the preceding few years because its "emotionalism" made it "unique", apart from Anderson's other work

Awards and nominations

Home media
On 22 January 2008, the film was released as a Region 1 DVD by The Criterion Collection.

See also
 BFI Top 100 British films

References

External links
 
 
 
 
 
 This Sporting Life: The Lonely Heart an essay by Neil Sinyard at the Criterion Collection

1963 films
1960s sports drama films
British black-and-white films
British sports drama films
Films based on British novels
Films shot in Wakefield
Films shot in West Yorkshire
Films set in Wakefield
Films set in Yorkshire
Films directed by Lindsay Anderson
Rugby league films
Social realism in film
Wakefield
1963 directorial debut films
1963 drama films
Compositions by Robert Gerhard
1960s English-language films
1960s British films